That Kiljunen Family is a 1981 Finnish musical comedy family film directed by Matti Kuortti and starring Jukka Sipilä and Marja-Sisko Aimonen. It is based on the 1914 children's book by the same name by Jalmari Finne.

At the beginning of the 1970s, the production company Filminor had already planned a family film based on Finne's children's book, but at that time the project fell through because the topic was reserved for Yleisradio. After Risto Jarva's death in 1977, Filminor gave the directing opportunity to Antti Peippo and Timo Linnasalo, whose films had a rather weak public success, and the subject of Finne was taken up again: Matti Kuortti, a long-time Filminor native since the late 1960s as a sound engineer and editor in the company, directed That Kiljunen Family as his debut film.

The film was a commercial hit when it came out in the theaters and it gathered more than 200,000 viewers, which was the second most viewed in 1981 after Uuno Turhapuron aviokriisi. Due to the film's success, the film received a sequel The New Adventures of That Kiljunen Family in 1990, which was also directed by Matti Kuortti.

Plot
The film is about the Kiljunen family (originally Kiljander) living in the country, who are known for inventions and their loud voice, which the family name refers to (Finnish word kiljua literally means "screaming" or "yelling"). One sunny day, the Kiljunen family receive a letter in which they read that they have won a prize trip to Helsinki in a quiz. When the family then arrives in the capital of Finland, which is not already prepared for the arrival of such a loud and distinctive family, nothing is the same anymore.

Cast
 Jukka Sipilä as Mr. Kiljunen, the father of family
 Marja-Sisko Aimonen as Mrs. Kiljunen, the mother of family
 Jouni Lukus as Mikael "Mökö" Kiljunen, the first son of family
 Kai Lemmetty as Lennart "Luru" Kiljunen, the second son of family
 Salli Pallasmaa as Olga Vilhelmiina "Plättä" Kiljunen, the daughter of family
 Tuija Ahvonen as Liisa Lehto, the journalist
 Paavo Piskonen as Reiska, the photographer
 Markku Blomqvist as Mr. Puputti, the editor-in-chief
 Antti Litja as the Mayor of Helsinki
 Esa Pakarinen Jr. as Jalmari Finne, the author of Kiljusen herrasväki books

References

External links 
 

1981 films
1981 comedy films
1980s Finnish-language films
Finnish children's films
Finnish musical comedy films
Films based on children's books